Voorwindia tiberiana is a species of minute sea snail, a marine gastropod mollusk or micromollusk in the family Rissoidae.

Description
The size of its minute shell is 0.7mm

Distribution
This species is found in the Red Sea.

References

External links
 Gastropods.com : Voorwindia tiberiana; photo

Rissoidae
Gastropods described in 1869